Miura 5 is a two-stage European orbital recoverable launch vehicle of the Spanish company PLD Space currently under development. Miura 5 will be 24.9 m long, capable of inserting 900 kg of payload into a low Earth orbit (LEO), featuring an optional kick stage that can circularize the orbits of satellites. All stages are planned to be liquid-propelled. The launch vehicle was previously called Arion 2 but in 2018 PLD Space changed its name.

Design 

The two stages (expandable to 3) of the Miura 5 are planned to use liquid fuel and are designed to reuse most of the technology developed for Miura 1, being the new engine and propellant tanks. The first stage is planned to be reusable through the combined use of its engines and parachutes for retrieval.

The Miura 5 will use a TEPREL-C turbopump engine, unlike previous versions which use a pressurized tank cycle.

A lift capacity of 150 kilograms was originally envisioned, but in 2018 lift capacity was doubled after a 10-month European Space Agency review that concluded launching up to 300 kilograms to a 500-kilometer orbit should be pursued.

Its reuse capabilities are planned to allow it to be launched 3 times.

LPSR Program
In October 2016, the ESA chose PLD Space as the main contractor of the LPSR ("Liquid Propulsion Stage Recovery") program, part of the agency's Future Launchers Preparatory Programme (FLPP), for the development of a reusable first stage with a budget of 750,000 euros. The main objective is to provide the reusable first stage Miura 5 launcher with parachute for return although the possibility of using controlled paragliders or "ballutes" will also be explored. The system will be tested at first in Miura 1.

Development
On 11 April 2019, PLD Space performed a successful crash and recovery test of the first stage of a Miura 5 demonstrator (1.5 m diameter instead of 1.8 m) in El Arenosillo. The stage was dropped from a height of 5 km, slowed down with three parachutes and touched the water, where it was recovered.

Launch sites
In July 2019, PLD Space reached an agreement with CNES to study the launch of Miura 5 from CSG, French Guiana. As part of an agreement, INTA is also helping them procure a launch site, being El Hierro Launch Centre the best option from a technical point of view. Recently PLD Space has shared the possibility of making launches from the planned spaceport in Azores but the status of this proposal is unknown.

Launch schedule
The first test flight of Miura 5 is planned to take place in 2024.

See also

References

External links
 Official Miura 5 product website

Space launch vehicles of Spain
Space launch vehicles of Europe
Partially reusable space launch vehicles